The Journal of Industrial Relations is a peer-reviewed academic journal published five times a year by SAGE Publications on behalf of the Australian Labour and Employment Relations Association (ALERA). It was established in 1958 and is currently edited by Amanda Pyman and Lucy Taksa [Deakin University]). The journal covers all aspects of employment relations.

Both ALERA and its journal provide fora for research and discussions on a wide range of industrial relations related issues, including employment and employer practices, work organisation, pay and conditions, labour law and state policies, representation and rights at work, and trade unionism, as well as broader social and economic issues such as job quality, the future of work and digitalisation, workplace health and safety, diversity including gender, ethnicity, age and disability, and modern slavery.

The Journal's mission is to publish high quality research papers that can advance multi-disciplinary knowledge of past, present and future issues relating to employment, work organisation and labour regulation. It promotes improved theoretical understanding of contemporary issues affecting capital and labour and the changing nature of industrial relations in Australia and internationally.

The vision of the JIR is to contribute to academic scholarship, policy debates and professional practice in industrial relations in the twenty first century. We aim to enhance the journal’s reputation in Australia and globally, through a multidisciplinary approach to work and employment issues to ensure the journal contributes to the furthering of theory, knowledge and practice in the industrial relations field.

Abstracting and indexing 
The journal is abstracted and indexed in Scopus and the Social Sciences Citation Index. According to the Journal Citation Reports, the journal has a 2020 impact factor of 2.079.

References

External links
 

Business and management journals
SAGE Publishing academic journals
Publications established in 1959
English-language journals
5 times per year journals